Binnya Set was governor of Dagon from 1415 to 1418. He was appointed governor  April 1415 by his father King Razadarit of Hanthawaddy Pegu during the long running war against the northern Ava Kingdom. He was captured by the Ava armies in early 1418, and brought back to their capital of Ava (Inwa). There, Set was given good treatment befitting a prince. Chronicles do not say that he ever returned to his native country.

Notes

References

Bibliography
 
 

Hanthawaddy dynasty
1390s births
Year of death unknown
Burmese people of Mon descent